Syncoelicotylinae is a subfamily within  family Microcotylidae and class Monogenea. 

Members of Syncoelicotylinae are characterised by a symmetrical haptor with two separate lobes.

Species
According to the World Register of Marine Species,  there are three genera  in this subfamily:

References

Microcotylidae
Protostome subfamilies